Alypophanes is a genus of moths of the family Noctuidae.

Species
 Alypophanes flavirosea Hampson, 1911
 Alypophanes iridocosma Turner, 1908
 Alypophanes phoenicoxantha Hampson, 1911

References
 Alypophanes at Markku Savela's Lepidoptera and Some Other Life Forms
 
 

Acontiinae
Noctuoidea genera